Fridolin Wagner (born 23 September 1997) is a German professional footballer who plays as a midfielder for Waldhof Mannheim.

He has been a youth international for Germany on multiple levels.

Career
In January 2017, Wagner joined 3. Liga side Werder Bremen II from league rivals FSV Zwickau.

In May 2019, it was announced he would join SC Preußen Münster for the 2019–20 season having agreed a contract until 2021. He followed coach Sven Hübscher who would also join the club from Werder Bremen II in the summer.

References

1997 births
Living people
German footballers
Footballers from Leipzig
Association football midfielders
Germany youth international footballers
Regionalliga players
3. Liga players
RB Leipzig II players
FSV Zwickau players
SV Werder Bremen II players
SC Preußen Münster players
KFC Uerdingen 05 players
SV Waldhof Mannheim players